Elections for the House of Representatives of the Philippines were held on November 8, 1949. Held on the same day as the presidential election, the party of the incumbent president, Elpidio Quirino's Liberal Party, won a majority of the seats in the House of Representatives.

This will be the first time in what would be a pattern in which the party of the incumbent president wins the elections for the members of the House of Representatives.

The elected representatives served in the 2nd Congress from 1949 to 1953.

Results

Note

A.  The combined number of seats of the Liberal Party before it was divided into two factions.

See also
2nd Congress of the Philippines

References

  

1949
1949 elections in the Philippines